James Stansfield, Stansfeld or Stanfield may refer to:

 James Stansfield (footballer) (born 1978), English footballer
 Bert Stansfield (James Burton Stansfield, 1874–1938), English football manager
 James Warden Stansfield (1906–1991), English barrister and judge
 James Stansfield Collier (1870–1935), English physician and neurologist
 Sir James Stansfeld (1820–98), English Liberal politician and president of the Local Government Board (1871–4, 1886)
 James Rawdon Stansfeld (1866–1936), English army officer
 James Stanfield, American academic and film producer
 James Field Stanfield (1749–1824), Irish actor, abolitionist, and author
 Jim Stanfield, Canadian ice hockey player

See also
 Stansfield (surname)
 Stansfield (disambiguation)
 Stansfeld (surname)
 Stanfield (surname)
 Standfield